Lou Fanánek Hagen (real name František Moravec, born 18 June 1966) is a Czech musician, composer, lyricist, and frontman of the punk band Tři sestry.

Career

Tři sestry
In 1985, František Moravec became the singer and frontman of the punk band Tři sestry and adopted the moniker Lou Fanánek Hagen, naming himself after his two idols, Nina Hagen and Lou Reed. He has remained with the band throughout their career. In 2021, they released their latest album, titled Sex drógy rokenról.

Other activities
After the Velvet Revolution, Hagen began composing songs for Těžkej Pokondr, as well as for other well-known artists, such as Karel Gott, Lucie Bílá, Hana Zagorová, Věra Špinarová, and Maxim Turbulenc.

Between 1992 and 1993, he fronted the punk band Hagen Baden with David Matásek from Orlík. The group also included Jakub Maleček, Ronald Seitl, and Martin Roubínek. They released two albums: Hagen Baden (1992) and Ahoj kluci (1993).

In 2001, he participated in the composition of the libretto for the Czech musical Kleopatra. He has also collaborated on a number of musicals with Michal David. In 2009, he was inducted into the Beatová síň slávy.

Personal life
Moravec was born in Prague. After high school, he attended the Fakulta stavební ČVUT (Faculty of Civil Engineering of the Czech Technical University), where he obtained the title of engineer. He also studied interdisciplinary journalism at Charles University.

In 1986, while crossing a set of train tracks, Moravec was hit by a train, causing him to lose his lower right leg. He has worn a prosthesis ever since.

In the mid-1990s, he self-published an autobiographical book titled Tak to bylo, tak to je…, which was reissued in 2007. He followed it in 2010 with his second book, Járo, kakao!

Moravec has a total of seven children, from two marriages. With his first wife, he has sons Daniel, Mikoláš, Oskar, and Matyáš. He has a daughter with his second wife, Veronika Moravová, named Mariana.

References

External links

 Tři sestry official website
 

Czech composers
Czechoslovak male singers
1966 births
People from Prague
Living people
20th-century Czech male singers
21st-century Czech male singers